The Pakistani Chess Championship is organized by the Chess Federation of Pakistan. Prior to 1970 four championships were held in West Pakistan without participation by players from East Pakistan. This changed in 1970 with the founding of the Pakistan National Chess Federation, which for the first time incorporated players and executive members from both parts of Pakistan, and the national championship that year was held in Chittagong. In 1977 the name of the organization was changed to the Chess Federation of Pakistan. The first Pakistani Women's Chess Championship was held in 2000.

Open championship winners
{| class="sortable wikitable"
! !! Year !! Place !! Champion
|-
| 1  || 1959    || Lahore        ||Shaikh Muhammad Akram
|-
| 2  || 1960    || Lahore           ||Shaikh Muhammad Akram
|-
| 3  || 1962    || Lahore          || Abdul Sattar
|-
| 4  || 1964    || Karachi       ||Shaikh Muhammad Akram
|-
| 5  || 1970    || Chittagong    || Zahiruddin Farooqui
|-
| 6  || 1974    || Karachi           ||Ghulam Dastgir Butt
|-
| 7  || 1976    || Rawalpindi    ||Zahiruddin Farooqui
|-
| 8  || 1978    || Karachi           ||Zahiruddin Farooqui
|-
| 9  || 1979    || Karachi          ||Zahiruddin Farooqui
|-
| 10 || 1980    || Lahore           ||Shahzad Mirza
|-
| 11 || 1982    || Karachi           || Mahmood Khan
|-
| 12 || 1983    || Sargodha      || Mahmood Lodhi
|-
| 13 || 1984    || Quetta        ||Mahmood Lodhi
|-
| 14 || 1985    || Karachi          ||Mahmood Lodhi
|-
| 15 || 1986    || Sargodha          ||Mahmood Lodhi
|-
| 16 || 1987    || Quetta           ||Mahmood Lodhi
|-
| 17 || 1988    || Karachi           ||Mahmood Lodhi
|-
| 18 || 1990    || Quetta            ||Mahmood Lodhi
|-
| 19 || 1991    || Lahore         || Tunveer Gillani
|-
| 20 || 1993    || Karachi          ||Mahmood Lodhi
|-
| 21 || 1997    || Peshawar      ||Shahzad Mirza
|-
| 22 || 1998    || Quetta           ||Mahmood Lodhi
|-
| 23 || 1999    || Lahore            ||Mahmood Lodhi
|-
| 24 || 2004    || Lahore              || Tunveer Gillani
|-
| 25 || 2006    || Rawalpindi || Tunveer Gillani
|-
| 26 || 2008    || Karachi           ||Mahmood Lodhi
|-
| 27 || 2010    || Islamabad     ||Mahmood Lodhi
|-
| 28 || 2012    || Karachi         ||Mahmood Lodhi
|-
| 29 || 2014    || Lahore          ||Mahmood Lodhi
|-
| 30 || 2016    || Karachi          ||Mahmood Lodhi
|-
| 31 || 2018    || Lahore          ||Mahmood Lodhi
|-
| 32 || 2022    || Gilgit          ||Amer Karim
|}

Multiple titles:
16 titles: IM Mahmood Lodhi
4 titles:  Zahiruddin Farooqui
3 titles:  Shaikh Muhammad Akram, Tunveer Gillani
2 titles:  IM Shahzad Mirza

Women's championship winners
{| class="sortable wikitable"
! No. !! Year !! Place  !! Champion   
|-
| 1  || 2000|| Karachi           || Zenobia Wasif
|-
| 2  || 2010    || Islamabad         || Nida Mishraz Siddiqui
|-
| 3  || 2012    || Karachi           ||Zenobia Wasif, on tiebreak over Nida Mishraz Siddiqui
|-
| 4  || 2014    || Lahore            ||Zenobia Wasif
|-
| 5  || 2016    || Karachi            || Ghazala
|-
| 6  || 2018    || Karachi            ||Zenobia Wasif
|}

References

Chess national championships
Women's chess national championships
Chess in Pakistan